In Greek mythology, Ariadne was a Cretan princess and the daughter of King Minos of Crete. There are different variations of Ariadne's myth, but she is known for helping Theseus escape the Minotaur and being abandoned by him on the island of Naxos. There, Dionysus saw Ariadne sleeping, fell in love with her, and later married her.  Many versions of the myth recount Dionysus throwing Ariadne's jeweled crown into the sky to create a constellation, the Corona Borealis.

The ancient Roman author Hyginus identified Ariadne as the Roman Libera/Proserpina at approximately the same time as Libera was officially identified with Proserpina in 205 BC, these two names becoming synonymous for the same goddess. Hyginus equated Libera/Proserpina with Ariadne as bride to Liber whose Greek equivalent was Dionysus, the husband of Ariadne.

Ariadne is associated with mazes and labyrinths because of her involvement in the myths of Theseus and the Minotaur.

Etymology
Greek lexicographers in the Hellenistic period claimed that Ariadne is derived from the ancient Cretan dialectical elements ari (ἀρι-) "most" (which is an intensive prefix) and adnós (ἀδνός) "holy". Conversely, Stylianos Alexiou has argued that despite the belief being that Ariadne's name is of Indo-European origin, it is actually pre-Greek.

Linguist Robert S. P. Beekes has also supported Ariadne having a pre-Greek origin; specifically being Minoan from Crete because her name includes the sequence dn (δν),  rare in Indo-European languages and an indication that it is a Minoan loanword.

Family
Ariadne was the daughter of Minos, the King of Crete and son of Zeus, and of Pasiphaë, Minos' queen and daughter of Helios. Others denominated her mother "Crete", daughter of Asterius, the husband and King of Europa. Ariadne was the sister of Acacallis, Androgeus, Deucalion, Phaedra, Glaucus, Xenodice, and Catreus. Through her mother, Pasiphaë, she was also the half-sister of the Minotaur.

Ariadne married Dionysus and became the mother of Oenopion, the personification of wine, Staphylus, who was associated with grapes, Thoas, Peparethus, Phanus, Eurymedon, Phliasus, Ceramus, Maron, Euanthes, Latramys, Tauropolis, Enyeus and Eunous.

Mythology

Minos put Ariadne in charge of the labyrinth where sacrifices were made as part of reparations either to Poseidon or Athena, depending on the version of the myth; later, she helped Theseus conquer the Minotaur and save the victims from sacrifice. In other narrations she was the bride of Dionysus, her status as mortal or divine varying in those accounts.

Minos and Theseus

Because ancient Greek myths were orally transmitted, like other myths, that of Ariadne has many variations. According to an Athenian version, Minos attacked Athens after his son was killed there. The Athenians asked for terms and were required to sacrifice 7 young men and 7 maidens  to the Minotaur every 7 or 9 years. One year, the sacrificial party included Theseus, the son of King Aegeus, who volunteered to kill the Minotaur. Ariadne fell in love with him at first sight and provided him a sword and ball of thread (ο Μίτος της Αριάδνης, "Ariadne's string") so that he could retrace his way out of the labyrinth of the Minotaur. 

Ariadne betrayed her father and her country for her lover Theseus. She eloped with Theseus after he killed the Minotaur, yet according to Homer in the Odyssey "he had no joy of her, for ere that, Artemis slew her in seagirt Dia because of the witness of Dionysus". The phrase “seagirt Dia” refers to the uninhabited island of Dia, which lies off the northern coast of the Greek island of Crete in the Mediterranean Sea. Most accounts claim that Theseus abandoned Ariadne, and in some versions Perseus mortally wounds her. According to some, Dionysus claimed Ariadne as wife, therefore causing Theseus to abandon her. Homer does not elaborate on the nature of Dionysus' accusation, yet the Oxford Classical Dictionary speculated that she was already married to him when she eloped with Theseus.

Naxos 

In Hesiod and in most other versions, Theseus abandoned Ariadne sleeping on Naxos, and Dionysus rediscovered and wedded her. In a few versions of the myth, Dionysus appeared to Theseus as they sailed from Crete, saying that he had chosen Ariadne as his wife and demanding that Theseus leave her on Naxos for him; this had the effect of absolving the Athenian cultural hero of desertion. The vase painters of Athens often depicted Athena leading Theseus from the sleeping Ariadne to his ship. 

Ariadne bore Dionysus famous children, including Oenopion, Staphylus, and Thoas. Dionysus set her wedding diadem in the heavens as the constellation Corona Borealis. Ariadne was faithful to Dionysus. Perseus killed her at  Argos by turning her to stone with the head of Medusa during Perseus' war with Dionysus. The Odyssey relates that Artemis killed her. According to Plutarch, one version of the myth tells that Ariadne hanged herself after being abandoned by Theseus. Dionysus then went to Hades, and brought her and his mother Semele to Mount Olympus, where they were deified.

Some scholars have posited, because of Ariadne's associations with thread-spinning and winding, that she was a weaving goddess,
like Arachne, and support this theory with the mytheme of the Hanged Nymph
(see weaving in mythology).

As a goddess

Karl Kerenyi and Robert Graves theorized that Ariadne, whose name they thought derived from Hesychius' enumeration of "Άδνον", a Cretan-Greek form of "arihagne" ("utterly pure"), was a Great Goddess of Crete, "the first divine personage of Greek mythology to be immediately recognized in Crete", once archaeological investigation began. Kerenyi observed that her name was merely an epithet and claimed that she was originally the "Mistress of the Labyrinth", both a winding dancing ground and, in the Greek opinion, a prison with the dreaded Minotaur in its centre. Kerenyi explained that a Linear B inscription from Knossos "to all the gods, honey… [,] to the mistress of the labyrinth honey" in equal amounts, implied to him that the Mistress of the Labyrinth was a Great Goddess in her own right.  Professor Barry Powell suggested that she was the Snake Goddess of Minoan Crete.

Plutarch, in his Life of Theseus, which treats him as a historical person, reported that in contemporary Naxos was an earthly Ariadne, who was distinct from a divine one:

In a kylix by the painter Aison (circa 425 to circa 410 BCE) Theseus drags the Minotaur from a temple-like labyrinth, yet the goddess who attends him in this Attic representation is Athena.

An ancient cult of Aphrodite-Ariadne was observed at Amathus, Cyprus, according to the obscure Hellenistic mythographer Paeon of Amathus; his works are lost, but his narrative is among the sources that Plutarch cited in his vita of Theseus (20.3-5). According to the myth that was current at Amathus, the second most important Cypriote cult centre of Aphrodite, Theseus' ship was swept off course and the pregnant and suffering Ariadne put ashore in the storm. Theseus, attempting to secure the ship, was inadvertently swept out to sea, thus being absolved of abandoning Ariadne. The Cypriote women cared for Ariadne, who died in childbirth and was memorialized in a shrine. Theseus, overcome with grief upon his return, left money for sacrifices to Ariadne and ordered two cult images, one of silver and one of bronze, erected. At the observation in her honour on the second day of the month Gorpiaeus, a young man lay on the ground and vicariously experienced the throes of labour. The sacred grove in which the shrine was located was denominated the "Grove of Aphrodite-Ariadne". According to Cypriote legend, Ariadne's tomb was located within the temenos of the sanctuary of Aphrodite-Ariadne. The primitive nature of the cult at Amathus in this narrative appears to be much older than the Athenian sanctioned shrine of Aphrodite, who at Amathus received "Ariadne" (derived from "hagne", "sacred") as an epithet.

Festivals
Ariadneia (ἀριάδνεια) were festivals in honour of Ariadne in Naxos and Cyprus.

In Etruscan culture
Ariadne, in Etruscan Areatha, is paired with Dionysus, in Etruscan "Fufluns", on Etruscan engraved bronze mirror backs, where the Athenian cultural hero Theseus is absent, and Semele, in Etruscan "Semla", as mother of Dionysus, may accompany the pair, lending an especially Etruscan air of familial authority.

Reference in post-classical culture

Non-musical works
 Ariadne: A Tragedy in Five Acts, a play by Thomas Corneille.
 In Letitia Elizabeth Landon's poem  from Ideal Likenesses (1825), she sees her as "a lesson how inconstancy should be repaid again by like inconstancy". She returned to the subject of Ariadne in 1838 with her : one of her Subjects for Pictures.
 Johann Heinrich von Dannecker's marble sculpture Ariadne on the Panther (1814), was well known in 19th-century Germany.
 The narrative of Ariadne is a theme throughout the second volume of George Eliot's novel Romola.
 "Ariadne auf Naxos", a poem by Heinrich Wilhelm von Gerstenberg.
 "Ariadne", a story by Anton Chekhov.
 "Klage der Ariadne", a poem by Friedrich Nietzsche.
 Metaphysical painter Giorgio de Chirico painted 8 works with a classical statue of Ariadne as a prop.
 Ariadne (1924), a play by A. A. Milne.
 Ariadne (1932), an epic poem by F. L. Lucas.
 Ariadne is a major character in Mary Renault's historical novel The King Must Die (1958), about the Bronze Age hero Theseus.
 An adaptation of the narrative of Ariadne appears in the novel Death in the Andes by Mario Vargas Llosa.
 Ariadne is the subject of W. N. Herbert's poem Ariadne on Broughty Ferry Beach (1983).
 In the Fright Night comic series (1989), a spin-off of the popular 1985 vampire movie of the same name, regular character "Aunt Claudia" Hinnault is the reincarnation of Ariadne, and she resurrects Theseus and the Minotaur during her first appearance in issue #12, "Bull-Whipped".
 Ariadne is the titular character in the Fred Saberhagen novel Ariadne's Web (2002) from the series The Books of the Gods.
 Ariadne is a recurring character in the book series The Troy Game by Sara Douglass.
 Ariadne, played by Elliot Page, is a supporting character who designs labyrinth-like dream worlds in the film Inception (2010).
 Ariadne is the Persona that the character Labrys wields in the videogame Persona 4 Arena (2012).
 Ariadne, played by Aiysha Hart, is a major character in the BBC series Atlantis (2013), which is loosely based on Greek myths. She falls in love with Jason and helps him conquer the Minotaur and escape the labyrinth. Later, her stepmother, Pasiphae tries to prevent their union.
 Ariadne, played by Sophia Lauchlin Hirt, is a character in the Syfy series Olympus, also loosely based on Greek myths. Daughter of King Minos, she is manipulative and in love with Hero, yet he does not reciprocate her love.
 Mark Haddon's short story "The Island", in The Pier Falls (2016), is an adaptation of Ariadne's narrative.
 Ariadne appears as a stagecraft in the German Netflix TV series Dark (2017), which employs the trope of Ariadne's thread as a metaphor throughout.
Ariadne appears as a minor character in Madeline Miller's novel Circe (2018).
 Ariadne is the main character of the book Lifestyles of Gods and Monsters (2019) centered around Ariadne's role in the killing of the Minotaur
Ariadne is the titular character in the book  ''Ariadne'' (2021) by Jennifer Saint which retells the myth from Ariadne’s perspective.

Musical works
 Richard Strauss's standard repertory opera Ariadne auf Naxos of 1912 was preceded by a L'Arianna each by Claudio Monteverdi in 1608, and Carlo Agostino Badia in 1702; Ariadne by German composer Johann Georg Conradi in 1691 and Arianna in ca. 1727 by Benedetto Marcello; and by non-operatic Ariadne auf Naxos works including a cantata based on the Heinrich Wilhelm von Gerstenberg poem, Jiri Antonin Benda's 1775 melodrama Ariadne auf Naxos, and Joseph Haydn's 1790 cantata Arianna a Naxos.
 Albert Roussel's 1931 ballet score Bacchus and Ariadne
 American composer Irwin Fischer composed "Ariadne Abandoned" in 1938, a short piece scored for solo piano or orchestra. 
 Ariadne, in a variety of incarnations and names, is a title character in R. Murray Schafer's Patria series of music dramas (1966-1990), notably The Crown of Ariadne and Asterion.
 "Ariadne" is a song in The Frogs, a 1974 musical with music and lyrics by Stephen Sondheim, book by Burt Shevelove, revisions by Nathan Lane (2004).
 "Ariadne" is the title of a concerto for flute, oboe, clarinet, strings and percussion, by the Austrian born Finnish composer Herman Rechberger (composed in Aigion, Greece, 2020)
 Ariadne is referred to in "All My Love" on Led Zeppelin's album "In Through the Out Door" (1979).
 "La Rosa de Ariadna" (1991), a lyric piece by Gualtiero Dazzi on a poem by Francisco Serrano I(published by Chester Music), was commissioned by the French Ministry of Culture with grants from the Fondation Beaumarchais and the Joven Orquesta Nacional de España. The first production, a European tour of five cities, was in a staging by Stéphane Braunschweig, with decors by Bernard Michel and costumes: by Bettina Walter. The two principal roles of Aridna and Minotauro were created, respectively, by Susana Mancayo and by Ian Honeyman.
 "Ariadne" is a song by Dead Can Dance that appears on the album Into the Labyrinth (1993).
 "Ariadne's Thread" is a song by Saetia, appearing on the album A Retrospective (1998).
 In 2004, the British indie pop band The Clientele released an EP called Ariadne.
 "Ariadne" is a song by Australian post-rock band Laura. It appears on the albums Mapping Your Dreams (2004) and (re)capitulate (2007).
 "Ariadne" is a song by The Crüxshadows. It appears on the album Dreamcypher (2007) and on the EP Immortal (2008).
Ariadne is a major character in Ulysses Dies At Dawn (2013), a cyberpunk-esque adaptation of classical mythology by musical cabararet band The Mechanisms.
 "Ariadne" is a song by indie rock band Typhoon. It appears on the album Offerings (2018).

Notes

References

Bibliography
 
 
 
 Kerenyi, Karl. Dionysos: Archetypal Image of Indestructible Life, part I.iii "The Cretan core of the Dionysos myth" Princeton: Princeton University Press, 1976.
 Peck, Harry Thurston. Harpers Dictionary of Classical Antiquities (1898).
 Ruck, Carl A. P. and Danny Staples. The World of Classical Myth. Durham: Carolina Academic Press, 1994.
 Barthes, Roland, "Camera Lucida". Barthes quotes Nietzsche, "A labyrinthine man never seeks the truth, but only his Ariadne," using Ariadne in reference to his mother, who had recently died.

External links

 Theoi Project - Ariadne Assembles Greek and Latin quotations concerning Ariadne, in translation.
 Warburg Institute Iconographic Database  (ca 380 images of Ariadne)

 
Cretan women
Greek goddesses
Princesses in Greek mythology
Deeds of Artemis
Dionysus in mythology
Theseus
Textiles in folklore
Olympian deities
Cretan characters in Greek mythology
Consorts of Dionysus
Metamorphoses into inanimate objects in Greek mythology